María de los Ángeles Moreno Uriegas (15 January 1945 – 27 April 2019) was a Mexican politician who was the first woman to be elected president of a Mexican political party.

Personal life and education
Born in Mexico City, Moreno Uriegas was the daughter of Manuel Moreno and Amalia Uriegas Sánchez.  She held a bachelor's degree in economics from the National Autonomous University of Mexico (UNAM) and pursued graduate studies at the Institute of Social Studies in The Hague, Netherlands.

Political career
Moreno Uriegas became an active member of the Institutional Revolutionary Party (PRI) in 1960.  She served in the cabinet of President Carlos Salinas de Gortari as Secretary of Fisheries from December 1988 to May 1991. She was then elected to the Chamber of Deputies, where she served as President in 1992. In December 1994, Moreno was elected President of her political party, becoming the first woman in Mexico to hold that position.  From 1994 to 2000, she served in the Senate, representing the Federal District; in 1997, she was the President of the Senate and in 1999, President of the Permanent Commission of the Congress. From 2000 to 2003, she served as a deputy in the Legislative Assembly of the Federal District. In 2006, she returned to the Senate through the proportional representation (PR) mechanism.

Moreno died in Mexico City on 27 April 2019, at the age of 74.

References

1945 births
2019 deaths
People from Mexico City
National Autonomous University of Mexico alumni
Members of the Senate of the Republic (Mexico)
Members of the Chamber of Deputies (Mexico)
Presidents of the Chamber of Deputies (Mexico)
Presidents of the Senate of the Republic (Mexico)
Presidents of the Institutional Revolutionary Party
Women members of the Senate of the Republic (Mexico)
21st-century Mexican politicians
21st-century Mexican women politicians
Women members of the Chamber of Deputies (Mexico)
Women legislative speakers
20th-century Mexican politicians
20th-century Mexican women politicians